L'avventuriero  (internationally released as The Rover) is a 1967 Italian war-drama film directed by Terence Young and starring Anthony Quinn. It is based on the 1923 novel The Rover written by Joseph Conrad.

Cast 
Anthony Quinn as Peyrol
Rosanna Schiaffino as Arlette
Rita Hayworth as Caterina
Richard Johnson as Real
Ivo Garrani as Scevola
Mino Doro as Dussard
Luciano Rossi as Michel
Mirko Valentin as Jacot
Giovanni Di Benedetto as Lt. Bolt
Anthony Dawson as Capitain Vincent

Reception
The film performed disappointingly at the box office, earning $225,000 in rentals internationally and $70,000 domestically. According to ABC records, it suffered an overall loss of $1,595,000.

References

External links

1967 films
1960s English-language films
English-language Italian films
Films directed by Terence Young
Films based on works by Joseph Conrad
Films scored by Ennio Morricone
Films set in the 1790s
Seafaring films
Films set in the Mediterranean Sea
Films about old age
Napoleonic Wars naval films
French Revolutionary Wars films
1960s Italian films